Shaoxinggaoji high school, founded in 1956, was originally named Shaoxing County sixth Junior High School. Buildings occupy 75,025 square meters, with a total cost of 120 
million yuan. Two hundred thirty teachers with Bachelor's degrees offer 75 classes.

References

Schools in China
Educational institutions established in 1956
1956 establishments in China